The list of most-viewed YouTube channels is topped by T-Series, an Indian record label known for Bollywood music. T-Series became the most-viewed YouTube channel  and has more than 216 billion total views . The top 50 most-viewed channels have all surpassed 25 billion total views. 30 of these have surpassed 30 billion total views, and 18 have surpassed 40 billion total views, and 3 have surpassed 100 billion total views.

Top channels (views)

Historical progression
The first-created and first-viewed YouTube channel was "Jawed" created on April 23, 2005 by YouTube co-founder Jawed Karim. The first YouTube channel to exceed 10billion total views was PewDiePie in September 2015. Since then, 118channels have exceeded 10billion total views as of May 2020. Including recent YouTube star, Mr. Beast who recently exceeded 111 million views on his YouTube channel.

T-Series became the most-viewed YouTube channel of 2016, and exceeded 14billion total views by January 2017. It eventually surpassed PewDiePie to become the most-viewed YouTube channel of all time by February 16, 2017, and currently maintains the lead with over 162 billion total views. T-Series has also had the most monthly views since 2016, and received more than 2.8billion views per month as of May 2019.

The following table lists the channels that became YouTube's most-viewed channel at different points in time.

Timeline of most-viewed YouTube channels (January 2006 – December 2021)

See also

 List of most-subscribed YouTube channels
 List of most-viewed YouTube videos
 List of most-liked YouTube videos
 List of most-disliked YouTube videos
 List of most-viewed online videos in the first 24 hours
 List of most-viewed online trailers in the first 24 hours
 List of most-watched television broadcasts

References

YouTube views
Most viewed channels